Herringfleet Priory (also St Olave's Priory) was an Augustinian priory of Black Canons located in St Olaves,  north-west of Lowestoft in eastern England. The site is in the county of Norfolk, although prior to 1974 it was part of the former Suffolk parish of Herringfleet.  Founded in 1239, the priory was situated near the ancient ferry across the River Waveney. The priory of SS. Mary and Olave was founded by Sir Roger Fitz Osbert of Somerley in the time of Henry III. The remains consist of the undercroft, two aisles of the Lady Chapel, and the refectory, now a barn.

The original dedication was to "St Olave, The Blessed Virgin Mary, and St Edmund, King and Martyr". Saint Olaf was King of Norway. He was born ca. 995 AD and Christianised Norway. In Suffolk, there was no other dedication to Saint Olaf, but two in Norfolk, and over fifty in the rest of England, with six in London. On 20 August 1536, Sir Humphrey Wingfield, the Commissioner for the Dissolution of the Monasteries arrived, and on 16 January 1546 Henry VIII made over the priory site to a local man, Sir Henry Jerningham of Somerleyton. Now in ruins, it gives its name to St. Olave's Bridge, over the Waveney, replacing a very ancient ferry, and also to a modern railway-junction.

The Priory was allowed to hold an annual fair on St Olave's Day, 29 July. It was also given the lordship over Herringfleet and Burgh St Peter. The area has been excavated and several burials in the Canons' cemetery discovered. It is now in the guardianship of English Heritage.

Priors

1273 William
1300 Bennedict
1303 Thomas of Norwich
1309 William Dale
1329 John de Tybenham
1341 Philip of Herlingland
1354 John of Surlingham
1370 Roger of Haddiscoe
1391 John of Hanewell
1401 John of Wylughy
1430 John Wells
1460 William Bugal
1468 William Beverley
1480 Thomas Baget
1541 William Dale

References

External links

 St Olaves Priory at English Heritage

1239 establishments in England
Monasteries in Suffolk
Augustinian monasteries in England
Christian monasteries established in the 13th century
1536 disestablishments in England